Samaritanism is the Abrahamic, monotheistic, ethnic religion of the Samaritan people, an ethnoreligious group who, alongside Jews, originate from the ancient Israelites. Its central holy text is the Samaritan Pentateuch, which Samaritans believe is the original, unchanged version of the Torah.

Samaritans describe their religion as the holy faith that began with Moses, unchanged over the millennia that have since passed. Samaritans believe that the Jewish Torah, and Judaism, have been corrupted by time and no longer serve the duties that God mandated to the Israelites on Mount Sinai. The holiest site for Samaritans in their faith is Mount Gerizim near Nablus, while Jews view the Temple Mount in Jerusalem as their most sacred location.

History
Samaritanism holds that the summit of Mount Gerizim is the true location of God's Holy Place. Samaritans trace their history as a separate entity to a period soon after the Israelites' entry into the Promised Land. Samaritan historiography traces the schism itself to  High Priest Eli leaving Mount Gerizim, where stood the first Israelite altar in Canaan, and building a competing altar in nearby Shiloh. The dissenting group of Israelites who had followed Eli to Shiloh would be the ones who in later years would head south to settle Jerusalem (the Jews), whereas the Israelites who stayed on Mount Gerizim, in Samaria, would become known as the Samaritans.

Abu l-Fath, who in the 14th century wrote a major work of Samaritan history, comments on Samaritan origins as follows:
A terrible civil war broke out between Eli son of Yafni, of the line of Ithamar, and the sons of Pincus (Phinehas), because Eli son of Yafni resolved to usurp the High Priesthood from the descendants of Pincus. He used to offer sacrifices on an altar of stones. He was 50 years old, endowed with wealth and in charge of the treasury of the Children of Israel. ...

He offered a sacrifice on the altar, but without salt, as if he were inattentive. When the Great High Priest Ozzi learned of this, and found the sacrifice was not accepted, he thoroughly disowned him; and it is (even) said that he rebuked him.

Thereupon he and the group that sympathized with him, rose in revolt and at once he and his followers and his beasts set off for Shiloh. Thus Israel split in factions. He sent to their leaders saying to them, Anyone who would like to see wonderful things, let him come to me. Then he assembled a large group around him in Shiloh, and built a Temple for himself there; he constructed a place like the Temple [on Mount Gerizim]. He built an altar, omitting no detail—it all corresponded to the original, piece by piece.

At this time the Children of Israel split into three factions. A loyal faction on Mount Gerizim; a heretical faction that followed false gods; and the faction that followed Eli son of Yafni in Shiloh.

Further, the Samaritan Chronicle Adler, or New Chronicle, believed to have been composed in the 18th century using earlier chronicles as sources, states:

Modern genetic studies (2004) suggest that Samaritans' lineages trace back to a common ancestor with Jews in the paternally-inherited Jewish high priesthood (Cohanim) temporally proximate to the period of the Assyrian conquest of the kingdom of Israel, and are probably descendants of the historical Israelite population, albeit isolated given the people's reclusive history.

Conflicts between the Samaritans and the Jews were numerous between the end of the Assyrian diaspora and the Bar Kokhba revolt. Jesus' Parable of the Good Samaritan also gives evidence of conflict. The great Temple of the Samaritans, on top of Mount Gerizim, was destroyed under the orders of Jewish leader John Hyrcanus.

Following the failed revolts, Mount Gerizim was rededicated with a new temple, which was ultimately again destroyed during the Samaritan revolts. Persecution of Samaritans was common in the following centuries.

Beliefs
The principal beliefs of Samaritanism are as follows:
 There is one God, Yahweh, the same God recognized by the Jewish prophets. Faith is in the unity of the Creator which is absolute unity. It is the cause of the causes, and it fills the entire world. His nature can not be understood by human beings, but according to his actions and according to his revelation to his people and the kindness he showed them.
 The Torah is the only true holy book and was given by God to Moses. The Torah was created before the creation of the world and whoever believes in it is assured a part in the World to Come. The status of the Torah in Samaritanism as the only holy book causes Samaritans to reject the Oral Torah, Talmud, and all prophets and scriptures except for Joshua, whose book in the Samaritan community is significantly different from the Book of Joshua in the Jewish Bible. Essentially, the authority of all post-Torah sections of the Jewish Bible, and classical Jewish Rabbinical works (the Talmud, comprising the Mishnah and the Gemara) is rejected. Moses is considered to be the last of the line of prophets.
 Mount Gerizim, not Jerusalem, is the one true sanctuary chosen by God. The Samaritans do not recognize the sanctity of Jerusalem and do not recognize the Temple Mount, claiming instead that Mount Gerizim was the place where the binding of Isaac took place.
 The apocalypse, called "the day of vengeance", will be the end of days, when a figure called the Taheb (essentially the Samaritan equivalent of the Jewish Messiah) from the tribe of Joseph, will come, be a prophet like Moses for forty years and bring about the return of all the Israelites, following which the dead will be resurrected. The Taheb will then discover the tent of Moses' Tabernacle on Mount Gerizim, and will be buried next to Joseph when he dies.

Festivals and observances
The Samaritans preserve the proto-Hebraic script, conserve the institution of a High Priesthood, and the practice of slaughtering and eating lambs on Passover eve. They celebrate Pesach, Shavuot, Sukkot but use a different mode from that employed in Judaism in order to determine the dates annually. Yom Teru'ah (the Biblical name for "Rosh Hashanah"), at the beginning of Tishrei, is not considered a New Year as it is in Rabbinic Judaism.

Passover is particularly important in the Samaritan community, climaxing with the sacrifice of up to 40 sheep. The Counting of the Omer remains largely unchanged; however, the week before Shavuot is a unique festival celebrating the continued commitment Samaritanism has maintained since the time of Moses. Shavuot is characterized by nearly day-long services of continuous prayer, especially over the stones on Gerizim traditionally attributed to Joshua. 

During Sukkot, the sukkah is built inside houses, as opposed to outdoor settings that are traditional among Jews. Samaritan historian Benyamim Tsedaka traces the indoor-sukkah tradition to persecution of Samaritans during the Byzantine Empire. The roof of the Samaritan sukkah is decorated with citrus fruits and the branches of palm, myrtle, and willow trees, according to the Samaritan interpretation of the four species designated in the Torah for the holiday.

Religious texts

Samaritan law differs from Halakha (Rabbinic Jewish law) and other Jewish movements. The Samaritans have several groups of religious texts, which correspond to Jewish Halakha. A few examples of such texts are:

 Samaritan Pentateuch: There are some 6,000 differences between the Samaritan Pentateuch and the Masoretic Jewish Pentateuch text; and, according to one estimate, 1,900 points of agreement between it and the Greek LXX version. Several passages in the New Testament would also appear to echo a Torah textual tradition not dissimilar to that conserved in the Samaritan text. There are several theories regarding the similarities. The variations, some corroborated by readings in the Old Latin, Syriac and Ethiopian translations, attest to the antiquity of the Samaritan text, although the exact date of composition is still largely unclear. Granted special attention is the so-called "Abisha Scroll", a manuscript of the Pentateuch tradition attributed to Abishua, grandson of Aaron, traditionally compiled during the Bronze Age. However, testing on the scroll revealed it was created no earlier than the 14th century CE, in fact around a century younger than the world's oldest Torah scroll. 
 Historical writings
 Samaritan Chronicle, The Tolidah (Creation to the time of Abishah)
 Samaritan Chronicle, The Chronicle of Joshua (Israel during the time of divine favor) (4th century, in Arabic and Aramaic)
 Samaritan Chronicle, Adler (Israel from the time of divine disfavor until the exile)
 Hagiographical texts
 Samaritan Halakhic Text, The Hillukh (Code of Halakha, marriage, circumcision, etc.)
 Samaritan Halakhic Text, the Kitab at-Tabbah (Halakha and interpretation of some verses and chapters from the Torah, written by Abu Al Hassan 12th century CE)
 Samaritan Halakhic Text, the Kitab al-Kafi (Book of Halakha, written by Yosef Al Ascar 14th century CE)
 Al-Asatir—legendary Aramaic texts from the 11th and 12th centuries, containing:
 Haggadic Midrash, Abu'l Hasan al-Suri
 Haggadic Midrash, Memar Markah—3rd or 4th century theological treatises attributed to Hakkam Markha
 Haggadic Midrash, Pinkhas on the Taheb
 Haggadic Midrash, Molad Maseh (On the birth of Moses)
 Defter, prayer book of psalms and hymns.
 Samaritan Haggadah

See also
 Amram ibn Salameh

References

Bibliography
 
 Anderson, Robert T., Giles, Terry (2005). "Tradition kept: the literature of the Samaritans", Hendrickson Publishers.
 Bourgel Jonathan, "Brethren or Strangers Samaritans in the Eyes of Second Century ʙ ᴄ ᴇ Jews", Biblica 98/3 (2017), pp. 382–408.
 
 
 
 
 Heinsdorff, Cornel (2003). Christus, Nikodemus und die Samaritanerin bei Juvencus. Mit einem Anhang zur lateinischen Evangelienvorlage (= Untersuchungen zur antiken Literatur und Geschichte, Bd. 67), Berlin/New York. 
 
 
 
 
 
 
 
 
 
 Zertal, Adam (1989). "The Wedge-Shaped Decorated Bowl and the Origin of the Samaritans". Bulletin of the American Schools of Oriental Research, No. 276. (November 1989), pp. 77–84.

Samaritans
religion
Abrahamic religions
Monotheistic religions
Jewish religious movements
Ancient Mediterranean religions
Ethnic religion
Moses
Abraham
Religion in ancient Israel and Judah
Ancient Semitic religions